Malgassesia pauliani is a moth of the family Sesiidae. It is known from southern Madagascar.

The wingspan of this species is 24 mm with a length of the forewings of 11 mm. The holotype was collected in the extreme south of Madagascar between Faux Cap and Cap Sainte Marie.

References

Moths described in 1955
Sesiidae
Moths of Madagascar
Moths of Africa